Palitha Range Bandara (born September 8, 1962) is a Sri Lankan politician, retired police officer and current General Secretary of the United National Party. He is also the former State Minister of Irrigation and Water Resource Management and a former member of the Parliament of Sri Lanka from Anamaduwa.

Born Range Bandarage Palitha Range Bandara, Bandara was the sixth child in a family of eleven children in the remote village of Karuwalagaswewa of Puttalam. Bandara received his education at Ananda College Puttalam. He joined the Sri Lanka Police as a police constable in 1983 and served until he retired on 24 August 2000 at the grade of sub-inspector. Bandara claimed political victimization forced him to retire and the National Police Commission recommended that he be promoted to the grade of Assistant Superintendent of Police from his retirement grade of sub-inspector in December 2017.  

After retiring from the police service, Bandara contested the 2000 parliamentary elections and was elected to Parliament from Anamaduwa as part of the United National Party, being the third on the preferential list. In the 2001 parliamentary elections, Bandara topped the list of preferential votes, and was reelected to Parliament. Following the change of government in 2015, Bandara was appointed State Minister of Power and Energy.

On 13 January 2021, Bandara was appointed as General Secretary of the UNP.

References
 
 

Specific

1962 births
Living people
Members of the 11th Parliament of Sri Lanka
Members of the 12th Parliament of Sri Lanka
Members of the 13th Parliament of Sri Lanka
Members of the 14th Parliament of Sri Lanka
Members of the 15th Parliament of Sri Lanka
United National Party politicians
State ministers of Sri Lanka
Sinhalese police officers